Gabriele Gatti (born 27 March 1953) is a Sammarinese politician who was a captain regent (head of government for San Marino) for the October, 2011 to April, 2012 political term. The post was shared with Matteo Fiorini. He was Secretary for Finance from December 2008 to April 2010.

Gabriele Gatti, on 28 November 2011, denied all accusations of being the political reference, of the San Marino Connection, falling in Staffa Operation.

On 18 September 2012, Gabriele Gatti was mentioned several times in the "Final Report of the Council Commission for the phenomenon of infiltration of organized crime with powers of investigation" prepared by the Sammarinese Anti-Mafia Commission.

Honours 

Order pro merito Melitensi (it: Cavaliere di Gran Croce dell'Ordine pro merito Melitensi)

Order of Merit of the Italian Republic (it: Cavaliere di Gran Croce dell'Ordine al Merito della Repubblica Italiana)

References

1953 births
Captains Regent of San Marino
Secretaries of State for Finance of San Marino
Members of the Grand and General Council
Living people
Sammarinese Christian Democratic Party politicians